The 1971 Lower Hutt mayoral election was part of the New Zealand local elections held that same year. The elections were held for the role of Mayor of Lower Hutt plus other local government positions including fifteen city councillors, also elected triennially. The polling was conducted using the standard first-past-the-post electoral method.

Background
Mayor Percy Dowse died mid-term on 9 December 1970. Rather than hold a by-election the city council members decided to elect a councillor to finish the remainder of the term until the scheduled election 10 months later. Councillors elected John Kennedy-Good as Dowse's successor. The Citizens' Association, who had a majority on the council, did not select Kennedy-Good for the 1971 election instead choosing the deputy mayor (and 1968 candidate) Dave Hadley instead. As a result Kennedy-Good formed his own "combined" electoral ticket, consisting of candidates who were previously Citizens' and Labour affiliated, with which to contest the election. Thinking that the Labour Party was not intending to put up a ticket of their own, four Labour councillors joined the combined team. Labour did eventually decide to run its own ticket and party policy dictated that members could not stand for election against official party candidates resulting them having their Labour membership suspended.

In an evenly divided poll Kennedy-Good narrowly edged out former Labour councillor John Seddon to win the mayoralty. The city council was split three ways, with Labour winning a plurality of seats. Labour and Citizens' councillors made a deal to elect their own members to committee chairs and voted Seddon as deputy mayor, sidelining the Combined Team.

At the election both a father and son were elected to the council. Chen Werry was re-elected to the council on the combined ticket while his son, Dick Werry, won a seat on the Labour ticket. It also saw the election of the city's first ever Indian councillor, Govind Bhula, a civil engineer originally from Bombay.

Mayoral results

Councillor results

Notes

References

Mayoral elections in Lower Hutt
1971 elections in New Zealand
Politics of the Wellington Region